The 1965–66 season was C.D. Platense's 5th season in existence and the club's 1st season in the top fight of Honduran football.  The club obtained its first national title and became the first Honduran professional champions.

Squad 
1965–66 squad
León Jallú, Ricardo Fúnez, Miguel Howell, Gustavo Croasdaile, Francisco Brocato, Gilberto Solís, Federico Anderson, Gilberto Zavala, Roosevelt Garbuth, Alexander Guillén, "Chita" Arzú, Santos Díaz, Raúl Betancourt, Eduardo Murillo, Carlos Alvarado, Tomás Máximo, "Choloma" Romero, Félix Guerra. Coach: Carlos Padilla.

Results

Statistics
 As of 23 January 1966

External links
 Official LINA website

References

Platense F.C.
Platense